Ahmet Ümit (born 1960) is a Turkish author and poet. He is best known for his crime novels.

Early years
Ahmet Ümit was born in Gaziantep, in south-central Turkey, in 1960. His father was a kilim merchant and his mother a tailor. He was the youngest of the seven siblings. He finished his primary and middle school in his hometown. Ümit attended the Atatürk High School, however, finished it in Ergani, Diyarbakır. In 1979, he went to Istanbul to study Public Administration at Marmara University. He met his future wife Vildan during the university years, and married in 1981. They have a daughter Gül.

Ümit became a member of a leftist organization, which struggled against the military regime in Turkey. He took active part in the "No to the New Constitution" campaign against the constitutional referendum of 1982 following the 1980 coup d'état. He wrote a report about the police operation, at which his comrades were arrested after attaching protest posters on building walls. The report, in reality a short story, was published in Problems of Peace and Socialism, a journal of the Communist Party of the Soviet Union in Prague, then Czechoslovakia. His first story was so published in 40 languages. In 1983, he graduated from the university.

He entered the Communist Party of Turkey (TKP). In 1985, he was sent on scholarship to Moscow, Soviet Union by the party. He studied at the Social Sciences of the Russian Academy. In 1986, he returned home.

Writing career
Ümit started writing poems during his stay in Moscow. His 1998-novel Kar Kokusu ("Odor of Snow") shows traces of his experience in that period. In 1989, he left politics, and published his poems in Sokağın Zulası ("Stash of the Street"). During this time he worked in an advertising agency of his friend. In 1990, he co-founded a cultural-art periodical titled Yine Hişt ("Look here again!"). He published his poems, stories and writings in the periodicals Yine Hişt, Adam Sanat, Öküz, Cumhuriyet and the newspaper Yeni Yüzyıl. His 1992-published first story book Çıplak Ayaklıydı Gece ("Barefoot Night") was awarded the "Ferit Oğuz Bayır Thought and Art Prize" the same year. He contributed to the screenplay of the television serial of police drama Çakalların İzinde ("Tracing the Jackals") aired by ATV in 1993. Ümit wrote essays about Franz Kafka (1883–1924), Dostoyevsky (1821–1881), Patricia Highsmith (1921–1995), Edgar Allan Poe (1809–1949) and some other detective fiction authors in various dailies and periodicals in 1995. The TV serials Karanlıkta Koşanlar ("Runners in the Darkness") by Uğur Yücal and Şeytan Ayrıntıda Gizlidir ("The devil is in the detail") by Cevdet Mercan based on his short stories. His novel Sis ve Gece ("Fog and Night") was adapted to a movie by Turgut Yasalar in 2007. Ümit produced and presented a programme for Habertürk TV titled Yaşadığın Şehir ("The City, where I Live") in 2010.

He is a member of the advisory board of Okan University.

Bibliography
His works:
 
 Çıplak Ayaklıydı Gece (1992)
 Bir Ses Böler Geceyi (1994)
 Masal Masal İçinde (1995)
 Sis ve Gece (1996)
 
 
 Patasana (2000)
 
 
 
 
 Başkomser Nevzat, Çiçekçinin Ölümü (2005)
 
 
 İnsan Ruhunun Haritası (2007)
 Olmayan Ülke (2008)
 
 İstanbul Hatırası (2010)
 Sultanı Öldürmek (2012)
 Beyoğlu'nun En Güzel Abisi (2013)

Comics

Translated books
 In English
 
 
 
 

 In German
 
 
 

 In Polish

References

Living people
1960 births
People from Gaziantep
Marmara University alumni
Turkish male poets
Turkish male writers
Turkish crime fiction writers
Detective fiction writers